is a Japanese alpine skier who competed for Japan at the 2018 Winter Olympics.

Early life
Ishii was born on 23 May 1989 in Utashinai, Hokkaidō, Japan. He first skied at age 2 and took alpine skiing seriously during his first year of primary school in Utashinai. He studied at the Tokai University in Tokyo

Career
Tomoya Ishii is part of Goldwin Ski Club a skiing organization based in Japan. In 2014 he moved to Austria to focus on his training as well as to compete in Europe. He trains under national coach Yasuyuki Takishita. He made his Olympic debut at the grand slalom event of the 2018 Winter Olympics on 18 February. He had a total time of 2:24.78 in two runs and placed 30th. In the first run he placed 35th. He is the best placed skier representing an Asian country.

References

1989 births
Living people
Tokai University alumni
Sportspeople from Hokkaido
Japanese male alpine skiers
Olympic alpine skiers of Japan
Alpine skiers at the 2018 Winter Olympics
21st-century Japanese people